Transition metal azide complexes are coordination complexes containing one or more azide (N3−) ligands.

Structure and bonding
Azide is a pseudohalide but more nucleophilic than chloride. As a monodentate ligand, azide binds through one of the two terminal nitrogen atoms, i.e. M-N=N=N.  The N3 unit is linear or nearly so. The M-N-N angles are quite bent. Azide functions as a bridging ligand via two bonding modes. Commonly the metals share the same nitrogen ("N-diazonium" mode).  Less common is the motif M-N=N=N-M, illustrated by [Cu(N3)(PPh3)2]2.

Homoleptic complexes

Many homoleptic complexes (with only one kind of ligand) are known. Coordination numbers range from 2 (e.g., [Au(N3)2]−) to 7 (e.g., [W(N3)7]−). Many homoleptic complexes are octahedral anions of the type [M(N3)6]n-:
dianions for tetravalent metals V, Pt, Ti, Zr, Hf
trianions for trivalent metals Cr, Fe, Ru, Rh, Ir
tetraanions for the divalent Ni
For some metals, homoleptic complexes exist in two oxidation states: [Au(N3)2]− vs [Au(N3)4]− and [Pt(N3)6]4- vs [Pt(N3)4]2-.

Mixed ligand complexes

Azide forms myriad mixed ligand complexes.  Examples include Zn(N3)2(NH3)2 and (C5H5)2Ti(N3)2.

Synthesis and reactions
Traditionally, metal azide complexes are prepared by salt metathesis, e.g. the reaction of metal chlorides with sodium azide.  In some cases, trimethylsilyl azide is employed as the azide source.

Heating and, in some cases, UV radiation often cause azide complexes to release nitrogen gas.  This behavior is the basis of their frequent explosive properties (see lead azide).  With suitable coligands, the resulting metal nitrido complex can be isolated.

Azide ligands are react with nitrosonium to give nitrous oxide.  This reaction is used to generate coordinatively unsaturated complexes.
[Co(NH3)5N3]2+  +  NO+  +  H2O  →  [Co(NH3)5(H2O)]3+  +  N2O +  N2

Metal complexes of organic azides are intermediates in the azide-alkyne Huisgen cycloaddition, the basis of Click chemistry.

References

Ligands
Azides